Phillip Edward Volk (born October 25, 1945) is an American musician. As the bassist of Paul Revere & the Raiders from 1965 to 1967, Volk appeared in over 750 television shows, 520 of which were episodes of the Dick Clark production, Where the Action Is, which aired daily from 1965 to 1967. The band themselves had 23 charted hits and 14 gold albums and Volk was a member of the band during the period of its greatest success. Volk's bass lines, as heard in songs such as "Hungry", "Just Like Me" and "Kicks", helped to revolutionize how the bass guitar was used in rock music. Volk was seen frequently in such fanzines as 16 Magazine, popular during the 1960s.

On leaving The Raiders, Volk formed a new band called Brotherhood with Raider bandmates Drake Levin and Mike “Smitty” Smith. This band produced three albums for RCA that were not commercially successful. Following the breakup of Brotherhood, Volk had a stint as a bassist with Ricky Nelson in the Stone Canyon Band, headed several groups of his own, toured the country in a rock-themed stage show, produced music for other artists, and started his own record label. He is currently making personal appearances with his new band “Phil 'Fang' Volk with Family and Friends”.

Early life
Phil Volk was born in Burbank, California to Anne-Marie "Mimi" Wagner Volk, a former singer, dancer, and actress and George Norbert Volk, an actor and businessman.  His father taught acting at the Pasadena Playhouse and appeared in some films. Volk was one of seven siblings, including brothers George and Danny, and sisters Irene, Marilou, Christine, and Jeannie. When he was a young boy, the family moved to a farm in Nampa, Idaho, about 20 miles west of Boise.

Volk was encouraged to sing by his mother, Mimi. The first complete songs he learned were "(I'd Like to Get You on a) Slow Boat to China" and "If You Call Everybody Darling" (the latter a hit for The Andrews Sisters). At the age of 3, he recorded these songs in a carnival trailer. His mother kept the recording, which Volk loved listening to as a child. Volk later used it in one of the cuts on the "Friendsound/Joyride" album called, "Child Song". Volk took dance lessons and gymnastics. At the age of 13, Volk watched Elvis Presley on the Ed Sullivan Show. Excited by what he saw, he asked his parents for a guitar and they gave him one for Christmas. He learned to play his first song, "Teen Angel" on it, as well as some folk songs. He also imitated Little Richard and Buddy Holly.

At Nampa Junior High School, he met a newcomer to his 9th grade journalism class, Drake Levin, who had moved from Chicago. At a noon dance in the school gym, the girls asked Volk to sing along with a recording of "Donna". While Levin and the girls loved the performance, many male students did not and threatened to “pants” Volk and cut off his hair after school. Levin helped him find a way out by allowing Volk to climb down a drainpipe from the second floor to escape to his father's car. The two boys were friends from that point on. At age 14, Levin came to visit at the Volk family farm, where he and Volk wrote their first song together. Levin came to live with the family for a time after his parents' marriage broke up. Levin stated that George Volk taught him some guitar licks while he lived there.

The first time Volk saw Paul Revere perform with his band was at a variety show at Nampa High School.  His older siblings were already well-acquainted with the group, who always drew large crowds when performing at area dances and clubs. Volk was impressed with the energy and showmanship of the band. Shortly after, his family moved from Nampa to Boise.

While attending Borah High School in Boise, Volk ran track. At the Idaho State Track and Field Meet in the spring of 1963, he was on two first-place relay teams, helping set state records in the 440 and 880 yard relays. He was fired from the band he belonged to at the time, The Chancellors, for attending this meet instead of joining them for a gig. He also performed the role of Conrad Birdie in the school musical, "Bye, Bye Birdie" in 1962. Volk also ran for Student Body President, but lost in a close recount election.

Volk's parents left to live in Europe when Volk was 17. His father was now selling insurance to soldiers stationed overseas. Volk left Boise in September 1963 for college at the University of Colorado in Boulder, Colorado. Intending to be a music major, he studied classical music and opera. In the meantime, he kept playing guitar in a band in his fraternity.

Volk quit school in January 1965, when Paul Revere offered him the chance to join him and the Raiders on tour. He informed his parents of his decision by telegram. By the time they got it, it was too late to stop him. Despite calls by the Volks to the Dean of Music and the administrators of the university, there was nothing they could do, since he was legally an adult.

Early bands
The first band Volk joined was called The Classics. They formed in Nampa, Idaho at Nampa H.S.  Volk played guitar and did some of the lead vocals. He remained with the band from 1960 to 1961. After the family moved to Boise in 1962, he joined The Chancellors with former Nampa H.S. classmate and former drummer for The Classics, Russ Bice. Volk again played rhythm guitar and did lead vocals. The Chancellors had a horn section and were a show band that also did instrumental songs. The band played the Fiesta Ballroom in Boise every Saturday night, taking turns with other local bands. These shows were well-attended by high-school aged teenagers from the Boise area. In 1963, Volk, as a member of the Borah H.S. track team, was scheduled to run in the Idaho State Track and Field Meet. Choosing to run in the meet, rather than go to a show The Chancellors were slated to play, cost him his spot with the band.

After his dismissal from The Chancellors, old friend Drake Levin invited Volk to join him in the band Sir Winston's Trio, a jazz-pop group, as guitarist/bassist. The band first played a place called Quinn's Lounge, but was quickly fired for being under-age. Following that disappointment, the band was asked to do a local television dance show in Boise. While in town, the trio decided to catch Paul Revere & the Raiders show at a dance club Revere owned called The Crazy Horse.  Revere had seen the Sir Winston's Trio on the television show and asked if they would be interested in becoming the house band while the Raiders went back to Portland, Oregon, their new home base.

However, he insisted that the trio have a drummer if they were to play his club. Volk and Levin did not know of anyone that could join the group right away, so they asked Revere if they could borrow The Raiders' drummer, Mike 'Smitty' Smith, for the first week they played the club. All three - Volk, Levin, and Smith - would eventually become Raiders and then would go on to form Brotherhood. Eventually that summer, the band changed its name to The Surfers.

During the summer of 1963, the band played the popular Miramar Ballroom in Boise and were given the opportunity to open for Paul Revere and the Raiders, by now recording and recently signed to Columbia Records, at the Boise National Guard Armory. The popularity of The Surfers soared with the addition of the choreography that Volk and Levin created for the band, including their "guitar battles" that involved intricate slashing movements with their guitars, all the while dancing and playing. They worked diligently on the choreography and their dance steps later became a big part of The Raiders show as well. Their most famous guitar battle came during the song, "Big Boy Pete", which they performed on 'The Tonight Show Starring Johnny Carson', among other performances.

In August 1963, Levin was asked by Paul Revere to audition to replace Charlie Coe, the Raiders lead guitarist. Levin, who had dropped out of high school, joined the band on the road. When Volk left for the University of Colorado on a scholarship in September 1963, the friends said goodbye at the Boise train station, not knowing that in little more than a year, Volk would also be joining The Raiders as the final piece in what would come to be considered the "classic" Raider line-up.

Paul Revere & the Raiders
In January 1965, Volk received a call from Drake Levin, informing him that he should expect a call from Paul Revere, who was in need of a new bass player for his Raider line-up. The current bassist, Mike "Doc" Holliday was leaving the group for personal reasons. Levin had to convince Volk to leave school in order to join the band on tour. Volk sent his parents a message overseas, informing them of his decision.  Volk joined the band in Las Vegas to perform at the Pussy Cat A-Go-Go nightclub.

At the end of his first concert appearance Mark Lindsay, lead singer, "baptized" Volk with a jug of water, making him an official member of the Raiders. Since all band members had a nickname, Revere suggested Volk call himself "Bugs" or "Bucky Beaver", due to the prominent eye teeth he often displayed with a wide grin. Disliking both of those choices, he came up with the name 'Fang'. At one show, he decided to grab some electrical tape and spell out the word 'Fang' on the back of his bass. Volk flipped it over to display the name to the audience, all the while dancing and making faces behind Lindsay as he sang lead. It became a signature bit for Volk and the group.

Volk and the Raiders continued to tour the Northwest, playing dance halls and clubs, while promoting their Columbia singles, without success. Paul Revere and the Raiders had been signed to a contract by Columbia Records in the spring of 1963, after local DJ Roger Hart, who later became their manager, brought their demo tapes around to the major labels. This was the first contract Columbia ever signed with a rock band. They released "Louie, Louie" in June 1963 and had regional success, but the single was beaten out for national prominence by the version recorded a few weeks earlier by The Kingsmen. The Raiders version did not get the promotion it needed to get national attention, because the head of A & R at Columbia at the time, Mitch Miller, hated rock and roll. It was only after his departure in 1965 and his replacement by Clive Davis, that the Raiders got backing by their label.

The Raiders first Columbia album was "Here They Come", which was released on May 3, 1965. The first side of the album, produced as a live performance by Bruce Johnston, featured former Raider bassist Holliday. The second side, produced by new Raider producer Terry Melcher in studio, showcased Volk on bass. However, the artwork on the front of the album showed Holliday as bassist, but the back cover listed Volk's name on bass. "Here They Come" remained on the charts for 45 weeks.

Recording with the band came easily for Volk, after long weeks of touring and getting to know the band's repertoire. Melcher used Volk's understanding of musical concepts, the result of his time as a music major in college, to assist in the studio when songs were being arranged. Volk could notate, understood chord structure, and knew how to write charts. In addition, Volk could play keyboards and Melcher often used him in that capacity. The first song on which the Raiders' new signature sound was evident was "Steppin' Out", written by Lindsay and Revere. Volk and Levin worked together on their guitar parts, with Levin coming up with a repeating lead line and Volk following with the same bass line that is played throughout the entire song. The song was the band's highest charted hit to date, peaking at #46 in August 1965.

The band's biggest break proved to be a huge one. On the basis of their popularity in the Northwest where they outdrew Dick Clark's touring show 'The Caravan of Stars', as well as because of Roger Hart's friendship with Clark, The Raiders were signed to be the house band on a new, daily show aimed at teenagers called "Where the Action Is". The show was picked up by ABC and premiered on June 28, 1965. Volk has said the show helped give him his own following, as well as establishing him as a unique personality.

By 1966, according to manager Hart, he was receiving as much fan mail as lead vocalist Lindsay. The band also performed on many other television shows during Volk's tenure with the group, including Hullabaloo, The Ed Sullivan Show, The Smothers Brothers Comedy Hour, Colosseum, Milton Berle, Batman, The Tonight Show Starring Johnny Carson, and The Hollywood Palace.

After the success of their first album, their television show appearances, and a national tour in the summer of 1965, the Raiders reentered the studio to work on their next album, "Just Like Us", released in January 1966. The album featured Volk's lead vocals on the cover of the Animals' 'I'm Crying', and the blues classic 'Baby, Please Don't Go'. The latter proved to be popular with the fans, even though it was never released as a single and as a result, the song showed up on many of The Raiders' greatest hits compilations.

"Just Like Us" became the first Raider album to go gold and their first top ten album. It also included "Steppin' Out" as well as "Just Like Me", which peaked at #11 on the Billboard charts. Not willing to lose the momentum the national exposure of their television show provided, the group recorded "Midnight Ride", the first album to contain song writing contributions from all five members of the band.

Volk and Drake Levin co-wrote "Get It On" for inclusion on the album, with Volk singing lead. "Kicks" was the big hit from the album, reaching #4 on the Billboard charts. Producer Terry Melcher began placing Volk's bass line further forward in the band's recordings, resulting in the bass driving the arrangements. In November 1966, The Raiders released their fourth Columbia album, "The Spirit of '67", which proved to be the final Raider album to include work by all of the members of the "classic" Raider lineup.

Volk wrote two songs for the album, singing lead on both: "Why, Why, Why (Is It So Hard)" and "In My Community". "Why, Why, Why" was written by Volk to mark the end of a relationship with a girl named Carol. While she wanted to get married, Volk, who understood that the image of a teen idol would not allow him to be married, decided to break it off. The song "In My Community" was the B-side of the Raider single, "The Great Airplane Strike", released in October 1966. Producer Terry Melcher did not have complete confidence in "Airplane Strike" as the A-side, as it was unlike any Raider song before it, so the decision was made to put "In My Community" on the B-side, which could then be promoted if "Airplane Strike" failed.

In addition to playing bass on "Community", Volk played rhythm guitar, with Levin on lead guitar, and a friend of Melcher, Van Dyke Parks, contributed the organ part. The album featured several other big hits for the group. "Hungry", which peaked at #6 on the Billboard charts, once again featured the bass part propelling the song. This stood in contrast to the previous top ten hit "Kicks", where Drake Levin's lead guitar drives the song. The creation of the bass line in "Hungry" was complex. It required that the bass part be recorded 3 times, then overdubbed. The components had to be synchronized: first, a normal bass line. That was followed by a line that was an octave higher and the last track was recorded as a fuzz bass, which was created by turning up an amplifier full blast, as using bass pedals wasn't available in those years. The result was what author and Rolling Stone magazine critic Dave Marsh calls, "...the center of the performance...a lethal bass line".

Volk's favorite Raider song was the last big hit of "Spirit of '67". "Good Thing" was credited to the writing team of Melcher, Paul Revere and Mark Lindsay. However, Volk states that the song was written at the Cielo Drive home of Melcher, in the Beverly Glen section of Los Angeles. It was later to become infamous as the home where Sharon Tate and her friends were murdered by Charles Manson. Some of the band members, including Volk, were spending a great deal of time there poring over ideas and jamming. Someone in the group said something like, "This is a good thing". After putting together some more lyrics with the others who were present and coming up with some chords for the song, Volk thought he would get partial writing credit, along with Jim "Harpo" Valley, Raider guitarist while Drake Levin was in the service. But neither Volk nor Valley got any credit for helping to create the record. "Good Thing" peaked at #4 on the Billboard charts in December 1966.

The members of the rhythm section of the band, Volk, Drake Levin, and Mike Smith, were becoming disillusioned with the overall direction of the band. While songs like "Hungry" and "Good Thing" remained true to the band's garage band roots, Volk and the others believed songs like "Melody for an Unknown Girl" were not relateable to what was happening in the world of music at that time. While Lindsay and Revere seemed to want to stay in the same musical groove, Volk and the others wanted to play music with a harder edge and sing songs that were message-oriented. They made the decision to leave the Raiders to form their own band. In April 1967, just a week after his older brother Captain George Francis Volk, U.S. Army, was killed in Vietnam, Volk, Levin, and Smith flew to New York from Los Angeles to perform on The Ed Sullivan Show. At rehearsals, Paul Revere had already replaced Levin with guitarist Freddy Weller. Volk showed Weller the steps he and Levin had made famous and Levin worked with Weller on his guitar parts. The Raiders performed "Him or Me", "Kicks", and "Ups and Downs". It was the last time Volk would appear as a regular member of the Raiders. Volk had completed half of the next Raider album, "Revolution", released in April 1967. However, he was not given credit on the album for his contributions.

Volk did return briefly in 1970 to the Raiders, at the request of Paul Revere, for four concert appearances during The Raiders tour with The Beach Boys. Revere was experimenting with having Freddy Weller and new bassist Keith Allison play lead and rhythm guitar, respectively. Volk took over playing bass for these concerts. In 1978, The Raiders classic line-up reunited for a final time on a Dick Clark prime-time special titled The Good Ole' Days where the group performed a medley of their biggest hits. Four members of the classic line-up reunited in September 1997, in Portland, Oregon. Volk, Lindsay, Drake Levin and Mike Smith performed for a crowd of over 10,000 fans.

There has long been a controversy related to whether or not session musicians were used on The Raiders hit albums during the years Volk appeared with the group. He says, "There were no studio cats. That must have happened later, maybe in the 1970s when Mark has turned up as producer and Terry Melcher left. I don't know, Mark brought some people in for "Indian Reservation (The Lament of the Cherokee Reservation Indian)", but when I was in the band, and I want to get this straight, I was the bass player, I sang background vocals, and I also sang some lead vocals on some of the songs, and it was Drake, and myself, and Smitty, and Paul on keyboards, and Mark played some saxophone. We were the players, because before becoming famous and national, we were on the dance circuit for a long time, playing up in the Northwest, and you know, we were known as the hardest workin' band in the Northwest, the hardest workin' band in show business. We would do a set of music at one of our dance gigs and our coats were soaking wet. We had to change outfits, because we had worked so hard on the set. So we were the players, and anyone who writes that we weren't doesn't know what they are talkin' about, they haven't done their homework". Volk also acknowledges that whenever session musicians were brought in by their producers, they were augmenting the band members, not replacing them.

The Brotherhood
In mid 1967, Volk, Drake Levin, and Mike Smith, along with organist Ron Collins, formed The Brotherhood. However, The Raiders trio were being sued by both Columbia Records and Paul Revere and although signed to RCA, could not release their first album, titled simply "Brotherhood". By the time the legal situation was settled, a full 18 months had gone by since the power trio of the Raiders had split to form The Brotherhood. The band finally released the album in 1968.

The band simply did not have the music ready to go once the lawsuits were settled. All the songs on the album were jointly written by Volk, Levin, and Smith. On "Love for Free", the band used a pump organ to create a sound like a classical fugue at the beginning of the song as Volk's solo. After playing it for his father, who had made some criticisms about the sound of the organ, Volk went back to the studio and overdubbed the organ 8 times to get a bigger sound. "Doin' the Right Thing" was mostly Levin's composition, but Volk helped finish it. Levin had lead vocal and played lead guitar, with the other members on bass, drums, and organ.

An engineer named Robert Moog set up a prototype of what he called a Moog Synthesizer in the RCA studios, where the album was recorded. That led to the Brotherhood using it on 2 cuts, "Jump Out the Window" and "Forever", having been asked by Moog to try it out. Ron Collins, the band's organist, didn't care for it much at first.  He later said, "I think it has some potential". The album was given polish by the hiring of Norwegian studio engineer Eirik Wangberg. He worked on the songs, "Somebody" and "Doin' the Right Thing". Volk states that his proficiency at mixing and engineering helped create what followed on subsequent albums.

The band and its members often found themselves in the company of some of the best musicians and songwriters of the late 1960s, including Johnny Barbata, Buddy Miles, Jimi Hendrix, Harry Nilsson, Stephen Stills, Steve Winwood and Lee Michaels, who would gather at Drake Levin's home to jam. The second Brotherhood compilation, Friendsound/Joyride, borrows its feel from those jam sessions. The album, recorded in 1969 in the same studio where Frank Zappa recorded, is heavily influenced by him as well. On the album's cover, the album is described as "a musical free-for-all". Volk, Levin, and Smith are joined by friends and popular session musicians for a self-produced jam session. The group was known for this album by the name Friendsound and recorded six extended tracks. The album featured experimental uses of sound, extended jams, and dialogue. Volk incorporated the first recording he ever made as a child into the last song on side 1, "ChildSong", which also uses the voices and sounds of children playing in a park and school as part of the background.  

The final album, titled Brotherhood, Brotherhood, was released in 1969. This album was closer to straight out rock and roll and featured covers of several previously recorded songs, in addition to new songs by Volk and Levin. Among the covers, Volk says that John Phillips' "California Dreamin'" was recorded live in the studio by the band in 25 takes.

His favorite original song from the album is "Back Home Again" written primarily by Volk, with help from Levin. Volk likes the strong environmental message of the song and states that Levin's guitar solo stands out with its surf-music feel. "(I Never Promised You a) Rose Garden" is Volk's favorite song on this album. It was a song recorded first by singer Lee Michaels, who rejected it for his album. Then it was offered to The Brotherhood. Michaels' voice was removed from the track as lead vocalist and Volk's added. Furthermore, Levin's guitar track replaced the original lead guitar track. The resulting song is an all-star compilation, featuring Michaels on organ, Johnny Barbata of The Turtles on drums, and Chris Ethridge of The Flying Burrito Brothers on bass.

The Brotherhood decided to disband later in 1969. The internet has helped to spark a new interest in the band. A two-CD set titled "The Brotherhood: the Complete Recordings" was released on February 4, 2014. The liner notes are extensively updated.

Rick Nelson and the Stone Canyon Band
Volk had several connections to former teen idol Rick Nelson. Volk's mother Mimi was the massage therapist for Harriet Nelson, Nelson's mother, and Nelson's uncle Don was manager of The Brotherhood. Nelson came to see The Brotherhood at one of their performances at a release party and complimented Volk on his singing and musicianship. The two started to socialize. In December 1969, Volk joined the Stone Canyon Band as Nelson's bassist, replacing Randy Meisner. Volk toured with the band for 7 months, including a performance with the band on The Johnny Cash Show. Philosophical differences, particularly over drug use, which Volk had renounced after the break-up of The Brotherhood, caused Volk to leave the band. However, Volk credits Nelson with teaching him some new styles of finger-picking on the guitar that Volk still uses today.

Equipment
The first guitar Volk played was a red, sunburst Harmony acoustic guitar, given to him by his parents for Christmas at age 13. His first bass was a Fender Precision, played with the Sir Winston's Trio. He had never played bass before, so he borrowed the keyboard player's bass and Volk and Drake Levin took turns learning to play it for the band.

When he joined Paul Revere & the Raiders, he was playing an Epiphone Newport bass. Shortly after, The Raiders were the first American band to be endorsed by Vox. The bass that Volk was given to play as part of the endorsement deal with Vox was the white Vox Phantom IV.  However, Volk disliked the bass very much saying, "The neck was as big as a two by four. If you look at some pictures you'll see that I put a Fender Precision neck on it. I had to have it custom fitted into the slot where the neck goes. And sure enough, after doing that, I could play the thing, and it really had a good feel to it. If you go to Seattle and go to the EMP (Experience Music Project) Museum -- that bass is hanging there. And it has the Fender neck on it!"

Wanting a better bass, Volk went to a guitar store in Los Angeles to purchase one. A young girl, looking to sell a Fender '62 Jazz bass to the owner of the store, walked in. The store owner was not interested, but Volk was. She offered to sell the bass guitar to Volk for $200 but she was not prepared to sell it immediately, needing it for a gig that evening. Volk also had a recording session that evening and struck a deal that she immediately sell the guitar to him, and he would loan her a brand new VOX Phantom bass which he had in the trunk of his car. The girl was to return the VOX bass to Volk the next day. Money and guitars were exchanged, and in a recent interview Volk acknowledged that he "never saw her again." Volk went on to record several of The Raiders biggest hits with the Fender bass, including "Kicks", "Hungry" and "Good Thing". He purchased a Höfner Club bass, using it primarily for television appearances because it was lighter and easier to carry. He did not use it much in the studio, because producer Terry Melcher preferred how the Fender bass sounded in recordings. Volk was presented with one of only 50 numbered Höfner Club basses a few years ago in tribute to his helping to popularize the model.

The Raiders used Vox AC-100 amps and later Vox Super Beatle amps in performances. There were several instances when the bandmates fell off the amps, so eventually they required spotters on their crew to catch them if they did.

Other musical associations
Following the end of his association with Rick Nelson, Volk went on to form a group called The Great Crowd. It consisted of 15 people, including a horn band and 4 female singers. They played at Disneyland and were recording on Lute Records. However, Volk's wife's former manager, who got them the job at Disneyland, asked them to scale back the number of group members.

The resulting band was called The Friendship Train and consisted of six members, to include Volk, his wife, former Capitol Records recording artist Tina Mason, and his sisters, Jeannie and Marilou. The group performed at Disneyland for 7 years. In the early 1980s, Volk and Mason toured with their own band, The Phil Volk and Tina Mason Band. The band broke up due to internal issues after a tour of the Northwest and Canada.

A Broadway-style show, created by Anita Mann, called "A Blast From the Past", was Volk's next gig. It featured songs from the rock and roll era and debuted in Las Vegas in 1986, where it played until 1993. In 1994–95, the show originated in Lake Tahoe, and finally moved to Hawaii in 1996. Volk, Levin, and Smith played several dates together following the 1997 Raider reunion, but when Smith moved to Hawaii, the group was unable to continue. Volk and two former Raiders, Drake Levin and Keith Allison, as well as former members of The Grass Roots and The Buckinghams, formed a group called The American Rock All-Stars. They performed at various venues from 1998 to 2002.

Fang and the Gang
Volk's newest group is Fang and The Gang, with whom he recorded his latest album "Fang Reveres The Raiders", released in January 2005 on Sonic Wheel Records, his own label. The album consists of covers of all of The Raiders top 20 hits, plus Volk and the band revisit his own compositions for The Raiders, including "Why, Why, Why", "In My Community" and "Get It On". The album also includes covers of other artists' work, a new composition by Volk, and a Brotherhood song.

The band's latest project was a cover of the Bob Dylan classic, "The Times They Are a-Changin'". The idea for covering the song came out of Volk's desire to record a new album. He began by listening to old cds and perusing the catalogs of different artists. Volk is a long-time Dylan admirer and Dylan recorded at Columbia Records at the same time as the Raiders, but the two rarely crossed paths. The new version is harder rocking than the original. Volk calls it, "A Song for the World in Turmoil". It was coincidental to the message of the song that Osama bin Laden was killed on May 1, 2011, the same day the single was released.

Volk stated, "We all share the fragile, little planet. We all need to work together, like Lennon said, 'Come Together' and 'Imagine all the people, livin' life in peace'. You know, that's a bigger vision and it's not only a vision that a lot of people have had, but it's also on a scriptural basis, that the world would be a better place if we'd all get on the right path". There is a scriptural reference at the end of the song "Daniel 2:44", placed there as a personal message from Volk. The song was played at Ground Zero the day after bin Laden was killed, and received a warm response from the crowds gathered there.

In November 2020, Volk released a 2-CD set called "Rocker", comprising 39 songs and covering five decades of his career.  The songs include some by guest artists and members of Volk's bands through the years.  It includes original music as well as cover versions of some of Volk's favorite tunes by artists who influenced him over the course of his career.

Awards
In 2007, Paul Revere and the Raiders were inducted into the Oregon Music Hall of Fame. Former Raiders Volk and Mark Lindsay were on hand for the induction ceremony and performed a medley of Raider hits at the show put on for the ceremony.

Personal life
Volk married singer Tina Mason, whom he met on the set of Where the Action Is, on June 25, 1967. 

They had four children: Christian, Kelly, Brian & Jessica & resided in Las Vegas, Nevada.

He & his wife were baptized as members of the Jehovah's Witnesses on July 17, 1970. 

Tina Mason passed away on June 21, 2021 after 55 years together. Volk remarried to a woman called Yvonne on December 16 2022.

Volk's uncle, character actor Jack Wagner, had a recurring role on The Adventures of Ozzie and Harriet as, "Jack, The Soda Jerk". 

His sisters also had show business careers; Jeannie & Marilou were part of The Friendship Train with Volk & wife Tina Mason

His sister Irene plays bass player & sings in the Ralph Mathis Band who is the brother of singer Johnny Mathis. 

Jeannie Snow is now a vocalist with the Tommy Thompson Band in Las Vegas.

References

1945 births
Living people
People from Nampa, Idaho
American bandleaders
American rock bass guitarists
American male bass guitarists
American rock singers
Record producers from Idaho
American music arrangers
Guitarists from Idaho
Record producers from California
Guitarists from California
Singer-songwriters from California
People from Burbank, California
20th-century American bass guitarists
American Jehovah's Witnesses
Converts to Jehovah's Witnesses
20th-century American male musicians
American male singer-songwriters
Singer-songwriters from Idaho
Paul Revere & the Raiders members